Ruth Alas (5 August 1960 in Türi – 23 January 2018 in Tallinn) was an Estonian management scientist. She was the head of the Department of Management of the Estonian Business School until her death. Alas has written more than 100 articles and 23 textbooks in topics relating to management and business.

Education
 Türi Secondary School (1978)
 Tallinn Polytechnical Institute (currently Tallinn Technical University), Faculty of Economics (1983)
 Tartu State University (currently University of Tartu), Faculty of Psychology (1987)
 Estonian Business School, International Business Management, Master's degree (1997)
 Bentley College (currently Bentley University), Faculty of Management, management training (1997)
 IESE Business School, University of Navarra (Instituto de Estudios Superiores de la Empresa, Universidad de Navarra), international complementary training (1999)
 Estonian Business School, Business Management, Doctoral degree (PhD) (2002)
 University of Tartu, Faculty of Economics, Doctoral degree (PhD) in the field of economics (2004)

Career
Alas worked as a programmer and a consultant. From 1995 she was a lecturer at the Estonian Business School, where she became a member of the senate in 1997, and head of the Department of Management in 2003. She has written about change management in organizations.

Alas has been published in the Journal of Business Ethics, the Journal of Change Management, the Journal of East European Management Studies, Human Resource Development International, the International Journal of Strategic Change Management, the Baltic Journal of Management, the Journal of Business Economics and Management, Engineering Economics, Cross Cultural Management, Women in Management Review, Chinese Management Study, the International Journal of Chinese Culture and Management, Social Science Research Network, and others.

References 

Estonian academics
1960 births
2018 deaths
People from Türi
University of Tartu alumni
Academic staff of the University of Tartu
Tallinn University of Technology alumni
Academic staff of the Tallinn University of Technology
20th-century Estonian educators
21st-century Estonian educators
20th-century Estonian women writers
21st-century Estonian women writers